This is a list of United Nations Security Council Resolutions 401 to 500 adopted between 14 December 1976 and 28 January 1982.

See also 
 Lists of United Nations Security Council resolutions
 List of United Nations Security Council Resolutions 301 to 400
 List of United Nations Security Council Resolutions 501 to 600

0401